The City of Berwick was a local government area about  southeast of Melbourne, the state capital of Victoria, Australia.

History

The area which came under the City of Berwick had previously been the Berwick and Doveton ridings of the Shire of Berwick. It had been incorporated as the Berwick Road District on 24 October 1862, and became a shire on 12 May 1868. On 1 October 1973, the area surrounding Berwick and Narre Warren, which was undergoing rapid population growth and urbanisation, split from the shire and was proclaimed a city.

On 15 December 1994, the City of Berwick was abolished, and along with parts of the City of Cranbourne, was merged into the newly created City of Casey. The Doveton industrial district was transferred to the newly created City of Greater Dandenong.

Council met at the Narre Warren Civic Centre, adjacent to Westfield Fountain Gate, in Narre Warren. The facility continued to remain in use by the City of Casey until its replacement by Bunjil Place in the late 2010s. It was subsequently demolished.

Wards

The City of Berwick was divided into four wards, each of which elected three councillors:
 Centre Ward
 East Ward
 North Ward
 South Ward

Suburbs
 Beaconsfield (shared with the Shire of Pakenham)
 Berwick
 Doveton
 Endeavour Hills
 Eumemmering
 Hallam
 Harkaway
 Narre Warren*
 Narre Warren North
 Narre Warren South

* Council seat.

Population

References
4. 2016 Australian census population of Berwick, Victoria

External links
 Victorian Places - Berwick Shire and City

Berwick
1973 establishments in Australia
1994 disestablishments in Australia
City of Greater Dandenong
City of Casey